Lyndon John Williams (born October 1964) is a former Welsh badminton player, coach, and currently involved in disability badminton. He won the  boys' doubles title at the European Junior Champions in 1983 and the men's doubles bronze medalist at the European Championships in 1988.

Williams has collected fifteen Welsh National Championships title, achieved 62 caps for Wales, competed at the 1986 Commonwealth Games, and reached a career high as world number 11. He ended his career as badminton player due to back injury at the age of 23.

Williams then worked for Badminton Wales for 18 years up until 2007 as national coach, performance manager and finally as executive director. He involvement in disability badminton started in the early 1990s, and became Vice-President of International Badminton Association for the Disabled (IBAD), before the successful integration into Badminton World Federation (BWF) in 2010. He currently works at the Edinburgh Badminton Academy and Lothian Disability Badminton Club (which he co-founded in 2008). He is heavily involved with Para-Badminton as a member of the BWF Para-Badminton Commission and chair of the 4 Nations Para-Badminton committee.

Achievements

European Championships 
Men's doubles

European  Junior Championships 
Men's doubles

IBF World Grand Prix 
The World Badminton Grand Prix sanctioned by International Badminton Federation (IBF) since 1983.

Men's doubles

References

External links 
 

1964 births
Living people
Sportspeople from Cardiff
Welsh male badminton players
Badminton players at the 1986 Commonwealth Games
Commonwealth Games competitors for Wales
Badminton coaches